Rizovouni is a village of Epirus and belongs to Preveza. Its oldest name, 'Podgoras'  (until 1927), is of Slavic origin (Pot goria se) and means at the foot, at the root of the mountain. The late modern "Rizovouni" attributes to the Greek content of the Slavic word.

The village has an area of 131.823 sq.m. and a population of 5,653 inhabitants. The area is characterized as semi-mountainous. The climate is generally Mediterranean type.

Geography 
Rizovouni Nicopolis of Preveza, formerly a community, today belongs to the municipality of Thesprotiko with the homonymous village. The Municipality of Thesprotico consists of the following municipal districts and villages: Thesprotiko (Lelova), Rizovouni (Podogora), Galatas (Boulimeti) and Zervo, Papadates, Meliana, Assos (Nasari), Nikolitsi, Elia (Dara) and Platania, Polystafylo (Rousiatsa). Geographically, the municipality is located in a valley called "Little Lakka Souliou", where the amphitheatricality of the villages, the olive groves, the orange groves and generally the rich vegetation are combined. The valley is formed between the Thesprotian Mountains (Baldenesi) to the west at an altitude of 1250 meters and Tsuka Podogora-Zarkorachi to the east at an altitude of 1270 meters. It also includes Lake Mavri, which was dried up around 1960 and part of Lake Ziros. The valley is crossed by a river, called "Ampoulas" (water source).

Rizovouni extends to the east up to Ziros Lake. Part of the lake area belongs to Rizovouni as well as agricultural land in the surrounding area of Tseropolis.

Similarly, in the eastern part of the village lies Kastri, a hill about 180 m high with archaeological and historical interest: there lie the ruins of the ancient city of Vatia or Vaties, a colony of the Ilians from the 8th century BC., as well as the Church of the Dormition of the Virgin Mary, formerly a cathedral of the Kastri Monastery of Rizovouni (today's metochi of prophet Elias). The present church was built and decorated in [1670], but is based on the central aisle of an Early Christian basilica, from which several parts are preserved.

Rizovouni today 
Rizovouni, according to the 2001 census, has 784 inhabitants. There is a day nursery, a kindergarten and an elementary school in Rizovouni. There is also an Education Club, a Women's Club, and in the past there was a former Sports Club (XAER and DOXA Rizovouniou). Residents' occupations are split between micro-farming and livestock, technical occupations and few services.

Sights 
In Rizovouni there are many churches and picturesque chapels, natural springs, orchards with oranges, small olive groves, flower gardens. Rizovouni offers beautiful mountain tours along the amphitheatrical village, at Kastri and Ziros Lake. Winter is rarely snowy, but rainfall is very common.

Churches 
 Agios Nikolaos (central church of Rizovouni) and old Agios Nikolaos
 Ascension (in the spring there is a festival)
 Agia Paraskevi (Old Monastery. Located in Meiraki)
 Little Agia Paraskevi (above Agios Ioannis. Located in Mahala)
 Agia Sophia
 Prophet Elias (Ai-Lias)
 Agios Ioannis (Ai-Giannis)
 Agia Marina
 Church of the Dormition of the Virgin Mary (Panagia-Kastri)
 Agia Eleousa

References

External links 
 Zirou Municipality
 Preveza Regional Unit
 rizovouni.gr 
 Weather in Rizovouni Preveza
 Rizovuni Weather - The Weather Now

Populated places in Preveza (regional unit)